Wan Kyun Chung from the Pohang University of Science and Technology, Pohang, Korea was named Fellow of the Institute of Electrical and Electronics Engineers (IEEE) in 2016 for developments in robust control theory for mechanical systems.

References

Fellow Members of the IEEE
Living people
Year of birth missing (living people)
Place of birth missing (living people)